Richard Mille is a Swiss luxury watch company founded in 2001 by Dominique Guenat and Richard Mille, based in Les Breuleux, Switzerland. The brand specialises in very high-priced clockwork watches.

Company history

After studying marketing in Besançon, Richard Mille (born 13 February 1951, Draguignan, France) started work at Finhor, a local watchmaking company in 1974. The company was bought by Matra in 1981, and Mille rose to manage Matra's watchmaking business, which then included the brands Yema and Cupillard Rième. Matra's watchmaking activities were sold to Seiko; Mille left in 1992 to start a watchmaking business for jewellery firm Mauboussin.

Development

Following a disagreement about commercial strategy at Mauboussin, where he was a shareholder, Richard Mille left his position as general manager to launch a range of watches. In late 1998, Mille presented his plans to his friend Dominique Guenat, owner of Montres Valgine (Guenat SA - Montres Valgine), whom he met in 1988 while working in Besançon for Compagnie Générale Horlogère (CGH) and with whom he worked on watches for Mauboussin.

In early 1999, Richard Mille and Dominique Guenat drew up their plans and the basis for the Richard Mille brand in partnership with Guenat S.A. Montres Valgine and APR&P (Audemars Piguet, Renaud et Papi). Over the next two years, they defined their brand concept, then began designing watches. They then founded Horométrie SA – their operating company for the new Richard Mille brand – as equal partners, registered on 23 October 2001 in the Swiss registry of commerce (wholesale of watch and jewellery items), and created the Richard Mille watchmaking brand in collaboration with Swiss watchmaking manufacturer Audemars Piguet, which became a Richard Mille shareholder in 2007.

After three years of research and prototypes, they exhibited their first watch, the manually-wound RM 001 Tourbillon, at the 2001 watch and jewellery exhibition Baselworld in Basel, Switzerland. The case showed the mechanism. The watch had a tourbillon calibre, a power-reserve indicator, and a torque indicator.

Richard Mille joined the Fondation de la Haute Horlogerie in 2007.

In April 2013, Richard Mille and Dominique Guenat acquired a 90% stake in Prototypes Artisanals SA, founded by Marco Poluzzi; former director Alain Varrin retained a 10% share. The company became ProArt and moved to a purpose-built 3,000 m² building in Les Breuleux. Following the sale of case supplier Donzé-Baume to Swiss luxury group Richemont in 2007, the Richard Mille company started machining its cases and some components, with ProArt as a subcontractor.

In 2013 Richard Mille turned down a proposal by the French group Kering to acquire 51% of the shares.

In 2018 Richard Mille withdrew from the Salon international de la haute horlogerie (SIHH) in Geneva.

In October 2018, Richard Mille opened its sixth and largest United States store in New York.

In late 2018 the RM 71-01 Automatic Tourbillon Talisman was launched, described as being made by a woman (women's collection director Cécile Guenat) for women.

Location
Richard Mille is a Swiss brand based in the town of Les Breuleux, in the Canton of Jura. It operates within the Montres Valgine company.

The Richard Mille Group 
The Richard Mille Group comprises the following companies: Horométrie SA (distribution), Guenat SA Montres Valgine (conception and assembly), ProArt (components), VMDH (decoration) and Cercle d'Art (publishing).

In 2018, the Group employed 148 people.

Guenat SA - Montres Valgine 
Dominique Guenat joined the Guenat SA - Montres Valgine (GMV) company in 1986 and took to the helm in 1991. In 1999, he teamed up with Richard Mille to create the “Richard Mille” watch brand.

All Richard Mille watches are developed and produced in Switzerland by the Guenat SA - Montres Valgine (GMV) Manufacture in Les Breuleux. Design and development are carried out in the old 1950s building in Les Breuleux, which was renovated in 1972, while assembly and quality control are performed in a building built in 2007.

ProArt 
Richard Mille watch cases and some movement components, such as baseplates, bridges, screws, and some wheels, are produced by ProArt, which belongs to the Richard Mille group.

VMDH 
VMDH (Vital Morel Décalque Horlogère) is located in La Chaux-de-Fonds, Switzerland, 25 km from Les Breuleux. It specialises in transfers and the decoration of watch movement components (galvanoplasty, electroplating, etc.) VMDH produces the dials and flanges used by the Richard Mille and applies phosphorescent pigments. VMDH is chaired by Yves Mathys.

Technologies 

Richard Mille watches are designed to be very shock-resistant and accurate. They are light in weight, using materials including grade 5 titanium, LITAL, Carbon TPT, and graphene.

Richard Mille teamed up with North Thin Ply Technology (NTPT), producer of lightweight pre-impregnated materials used in sailing and Formula 1, to produce the RM 27-02 Rafael Nadal in Carbon NTPT and Quartz TPT, and the RM 11-03 McLaren.

Technical innovation
 Development of the first baseplates in carbon nanofibres, titanium, and Carbon TPT
 Development of gem-set ceramic
 Invention of laminated sapphire crystal (RM 53-01)
 Invention of new watch complications: Oracle (RM 069), mechanical G-force sensor (RM 036).
 Invention of the variable-geometry rotor on RM 011.
 Invention of the declutchable rotor.
 Invention of Quartz TPT with the NTPT company.

Movement

The brand has designed its own manufactured automatic calibres, including a whirlpool movement:

Records

Accuracy of RM 031 
The RM 031 escapement beats at a frequency of 36,000 vibrations per hour, accurate to within 30 seconds per month. The RM 031 was limited to just 10 pieces.

Weight
In 2004, Richard Mille launched the RM 006 Felipe Massa Tourbillon, which weighed 48 grams excluding the strap, in 2005 the 29 g RM 009 Felipe Massa Tourbillon., in 2007 the 20 g (including strap) RM 027 Rafael Nadal, with movement  made from titanium and LITAL, a lithium alloy used in aeronautics that contains aluminium, copper, magnesium and zirconium.

In 2013 the 18.83 g (including strap) manually-wound RM 27-01 Rafael Nadal Tourbillon watch, developed with Nadal, was produced, limited to 50 pieces. The watch was the lightest tourbillon ever made due to its lithium aluminium movement and carbon nanotube case.

In 2017, at the Salon international de la haute horlogerie (SIHH), the RM 50-03 McLaren F1 was exhibited, the world's lightest flyback chronograph at 38 g (including strap).

Shock-resistance 
The RM 27-03 Tourbillon can withstand impacts of 10,000 g due to its skeletonised unibody baseplate made from Carbon TPT.

On 25 July 2009, during his Formula 1 accident in the qualifying stages of the 2009 Hungarian Grand Prix, Felipe Massa, one of the brand's "partners", was wearing an RM 006, which was undamaged.

Projects

Quebec City Clock

The Porte-Bonheur Clock was presented to Quebec City by the Republic and Canton of Jura and the Richard Mille brand in 2014 to celebrate its 400th anniversary. From 2008 to 2014, the Richard Mille company, the technical college of Porrentruy (École des métiers techniques in Porrentruy), and the Neuchâtel Haute Ecole Arc developed and built the clock, which is 3.5 metres tall, 2.5 metres wide and 1.3 metres deep, and weighs 1,913 kg. It required:
 6,571 hours of development,
 5,451 components,
 3,952 hours of assembly and adjusting.

Starck and Only Watch
In 2005, Richard Mille and the French designer Philippe Starck made their first collaboration, producing a single "RM 005-1 Richard Mille by Philippe Stark", which was sold at auction in Monaco for €285,000, the highest price for an automatic watch at that time, for the benefit of the charity association Only Watch.

Mille and Starck made the extremely complex RM 011 Starck for Only Watch 2007, with a titanium "bangle" bracelet integrated into the case. The watch sold at auction for a new record €320,000 for the same charity.

Planetarium Tellurium
In 1998 Richard Mille met Stephen Forsey and Robert Greubel during an assignment for Mauboussin. Forsey and Greubel founded the company Greubel Forsey in 2004. They asked Christian Étienne, owner of the Swiss watch clinic in Porrentruy, to assemble the prototype of a planetarium/tellurium, designated the Richard Mille Planetarium-Tellurium, with design and casing by Richard Mille.

The Planetarium-Tellurium combines a precise gear train and barrel for the planetarium with a detent escapement, making it the most accurate clockwork planetarium-tellurium of its kind at the time.

Planet Earth, weighing 91 grams, is made of silver, as is the Moon. The Sun is made from yellow gold, Mercury from pink gold, and Venus from natural stone. The planets are enamelled in different colours. The Planetarium-Tellurium weighs 44 kg, including its titanium case and protective glass.

Sponsorship and endorsements
The brand sponsors various sportspeople and sports events, including the Le Mans Classic and Grand Prix de Pau auto races and the 'Voiles de Saint Barth' regatta.

Aircraft 
In 2016 Richard Mille produced the "RM-50-02 ACJ Tourbillon Split Seconds Chronograph" in a 30-piece limited edition in collaboration with manufacturer Airbus Corporate Jets.

Sailing 
In 2006, Richard Mille launched a partnership with Italian yacht manufacturer Perini Navi. The watch brand became the official timekeeper of the Perini Navi Cup. To mark this collaboration, it launched the RM 014 Tourbillon Perini Navi watch in 2006 and the RM 015 Tourbillon Perini Navi in 2007.

Richard Mille has been the main partner of «Les Voiles de Saint Barth» since 2010, with the "Richard Mille Maxi Cup".

In 2007, Ian Williams, a British sailor, won the third edition of the Monsoon Cup under the colors Richard Mille, last round of the World Match Racing Tour in Kuala Terengganu, Malaysia, and became World Match-Race Champion.

Cars and racing 

Richard Mille is chairman of the Endurance Commission of the Fédération Internationale de l'Automobile (FIA).

The brand has always invested in automobile events, becoming in 2002 the partner of the Le Mans Classic.

In 2014 Richard Mille, in association with Patrick Peter of Peter Auto, contributed to the creation of the Chantilly Arts & Elegance Richard Mille automotive elegance competition for classic cars.

The Richard Mille brand has teamed up with drivers from Formula 1 teams, including Alfa Romeo Racing, Haas F1 Team and McLaren Racing, and from Formula E (Nissan E-dams, Venturi Formula E). In 2021 Richard Mille replaced Hublot as a partner of Scuderia Ferrari.

In 2017, Richard Mille and McLaren Automotive signed a 10-year partnership agreement. The RM 11-03 McLaren Automatic Flyback Chronograph – a limited edition of 500 timepieces jointly designed by McLaren design director Rob Melville and Richard Mille engineer Fabrice Namura – is the first product to arise from this union. The 500 owners of the McLaren Senna car, the first model in McLaren's Ultimate Series, could order a watch with a number matching the chassis number of their car.

Also in 2017, the watch brand became an official partner of the Yas Marina Circuit in Abu Dhabi and of the Circuit Paul Ricard in Le Castellet in 2018, where the "Tour Chrono" (race display board) was designed by the Richard Mille teams.

In late 2018, Richard Mille announced a three-year partnership with Venturi, the team managed by Gildo Pastor in which Felipe Massa, the watch brand's historical partner, competes alongside teammate Edoardo Mortara. Richard Mille launched the "RM11 Felipe Massa Rose Gold and Titanium."

In 2019, Tolman Motorsport ran a pair of McLaren 570S GT4s with Richard Mille as a sponsor.

The watch brand is also a partner of:
 The Spa Classic (in 2013), Belgium,
 The Suzuka Sound of Engine Richard Mille (since 2016),
 The Nürburgring Classic (since 2017),
 The Rallye des Princesses (since 2017),
 The Rallye des Légendes Richard Mille (since 2018),
 Rétromobile.

Other sports 
Since 2010, Richard Mille has sponsored Rafael Nadal, the Spanish tennis player launching the "RM 27-03 Tourbillon Rafael Nadal" in 2017.

Since 2013, Richard Mille has sponsored the Open de France Dames golf tournament.

In May 2011, Richard Mille created the Richard Mille Polo Team composed of Prince Bahar of Brunei, British player Max Routledge and Argentines Pablo Mac Donough and Alejandro Muzzio.

Art 
In 2014, Horométrie SA acquired Éditions Cercle d'Art, which publishes art books and books about watchmaking, architecture, photography, design, gastronomy, and cars.

Partners

Economics

Watch sales figures 
Sales of Richard Mille watches have grown by 15% on average per year since the brand was launched, with 32,000 watches sold between 2001 and 2017,

Number of watches sold by year

Revenue 
In CHF million.

Awards 
 2016 : Richard Mille and North Thin Ply Technology (NTPT) received the JEC World 2016 Innovation Awards prize in the Luxury category for the Quartz-TPT used in the case of the RM 27-02 Tourbillon Rafael Nadal calibre.
 2017: Richard Mille received the 2017 Prix Gaïa award in the Esprit d'entreprise (entrepreneurship) category from the Musée international d'horlogerie in La Chaux-de-Fonds.

Bibliography

References

External links

Watch manufacturing companies of Switzerland
Swiss companies established in 2001
Manufacturing companies established in 2001
Clock manufacturing companies of Switzerland
Swiss watch brands
2001 establishments in Switzerland
Luxury brands